Ahn Deok-su (born 26 January 1946) is a South Korean politician. He served as a member of the National Assembly for the Saenuri Party between 2012 and 2015.

Biography
Ahn was elected to the local council of Ganghwa County in 2006 as an independent, and was re-elected in 2010.

In the 2012 National Assembly elections he ran in the Seo–Ganghwa 2nd constituency in Incheon as a member of the Saenuri Party, and was elected with 51% of the vote. He lost his seat in March 2015 after his finance manager was jailed for violations of electoral law.

References

External links
 

1946 births
People from Incheon
Members of the National Assembly (South Korea)
Liberty Korea Party politicians
Living people